Deborah Gray White  is the Board of Governors Professor of History and Professor of Women's and Gender Studies at Rutgers University, New Brunswick, New Jersey. In addition to teaching at Rutgers, she also directed, "The Black Atlantic: Race, Nation and Gender", a project at The Rutgers Center for Historical Analysis from 1997 to 1999. Throughout 2000-2003 she was the chair of the history department at Rutgers. White has been awarded the John Simon Guggenheim Fellowship, the Woodrow Wilson International Center Fellowship, the Carter G. Woodson Medallion for excellence in African American history, and has also received an Honorary Doctorate from her undergraduate alma mater, Binghamton University. She currently heads the Scarlet and Black Project which investigates Native Americans and African Americans in the history of Rutgers University.

Education and early career 
White received her B.A degree from Binghamton University and her M.A. degree from Columbia University, and her Ph.D. from University of Illinois at Chicago. In 1984 she accepted a position in the history department of Rutgers.

Her seminal monograph, Ar'n't I A Woman?: Female Slaves in the Plantation South, was published in 1985. This book was among the first monographs on the history of African American women, and which was responsible for the creation of the Library of Congress subject category “Woman Slaves” in the same year. In a 1994 survey of the Organization of American Historians it was voted among the 100 most admired American history books. In 2003, the book was celebrated at a session at the meeting of the Southern Historical Association. In 2005, on May 20 and 21, a conference entitled “Slave Women's Lives: Twenty Years of Ar'n't I A Woman? and More” was held at the Huntington Institute in California to again commemorate its publication. The papers presented at this conference are published in the Winter, 2007 (Volume 92(1)) Journal of African American Studies.  The book was also celebrated in June, 2005, at the Berkshire Conference on the History of Women. The papers presented at this conference appear in the July 2007 issue of the Journal of Women's History.

Later career
White is currently the chair of the Rutgers University Committee on Enslaved and Disenfranchised Populations in Rutgers history. This committee was convened after Rutgers University students demanded a review of the university's relationship to the institution of slavery.  As the Chair of the Committee on Enslaved and Disenfranchised Populations in Rutgers History White organized the research and writing of this history. One of the findings was that Sojourner Truth, the noted abolitionist and feminist, was owned by the family of the first president of Rutgers. Researchers also unearthed a document that revealed that an enslaved man named Will was among those who built the first building at Rutgers. On October 26, 2017, Rutgers commemorated their service to the nation and to Rutgers. The new apartment complex was named “The Sojourner Truth Apartments,” and the walkway around Old Queens, Rutgers first building that now houses the offices of the President and Vice President, was named Will's Way.

Publications 
Lost in the USA: American Identity from the Promise Keepers to the Million Mom March (Champaign: University of Illinois Press, 2017)
Scarlet and Black: Slavery and Dispossession in Rutgers History, ed. (New Brunswick: Rutgers University Press, 2016)
Freedom On My Mind: A History of African Americans. Co-authored with Mia Bay and Waldo Martin (New York: Bedford Books/ St. Martin's, 2012)
Telling Histories: Black Women Historians in the Ivory Tower, ed. (Chapel Hill: University of North Carolina Press,  2008)
American Anthem. Co-authored with Edward L. Ayers, Robert D. Schulzinger, Jesus F. de la Teja (Orlando: Holt, Rinehart and Winston, 2007)
United States History: Independence to 1914 (California Social Studies). Co-authored with William Deverell (Austin: Holt, Rinehart and Winston, 2006)
Black Women in America: An historical Encyclopedia, ed. Darlene Clark Hine, et al., senior editor (New York: Oxford University Press, 2004)
Too Heavy A Load: Black Women in Defense of Themselves, 1894-1994 (New York: W.W. Norton, 1999)
Let My People Go: African Americans 1804-1865 (New York: Oxford University Press, 1999)
Our United States. Co-authored with Juan Garcia, Daniel Gelo, Linda Greenow, James Kracht (Parsippany, NJ: Silver Burdett Ginn, 1996)
Ar'n't I A Woman? Female Slaves in the Plantation South (New York: W.W. Norton, 1985, 1999 [2nd ed])

References

External links 
 Deborah Gray White on the legacy of slavery PBS.org
 Searching the Silence:Finding Black Women's Resistance to Slavery in Antebellum U.S.History

Living people
1949 births
21st-century American historians
Rutgers University faculty